José Miguel Villaú Cabeza (born Sevilla, 30 October 1971) is a Spanish rugby union player. He plays as a lock.

Career
His first international match was against Morocco, at Toulouse, on 28 November 1993. He was part of the 1999 Rugby World Cup roster, playing all the three matches. His last international cap was during a match against Portugal, at Madrid, on 2 June 2002.

External links
José Miguel Villaú International Statistics

1971 births
Living people
Spanish rugby union players
Rugby union locks
Spain international rugby union players